For the Summer Olympics, there are 34 venues that have been or will be used for gymnastics. Before World War II, the competitions were held outdoors. Since then with the exception of 1960, gymnastics have taken place indoors.

List

References

Venues
 
Gym